Kazhimukan Munaitpasov Stadium may refer to one of the following multi-purpose stadiums in Kazakhstan used mostly for football matches:

Kazhymukan Munaitpasov Stadium (Astana) 
Kazhymukan Munaitpasov Stadium (Shymkent)